Meru was an Ancient Egyptian official under king Mentuhotep II in the Eleventh Dynasty, around 2000 BC. Meru was overseer of sealers at the royal court and therefore one of the highest state officials. 

Meru is mainly known from his Theban Tomb (TT240). The tomb consists of the undecorated cult chapel and the underground burial chamber decorated with Pyramid Texts and Coffin Texts. There is a sarcophagus sunk into the floor decorated with friezes of objects and an offering list.

Meru is also known from a stela now in the Museo Egizio in Turin. Here his parents Iku and Nebti are mentioned. The stela is also dated under king Mentuhotep II. Meru appears finally in two rock inscriptions in the Shatt er-Rigal. Here he bears once the title overseer of the foreign lands.

References

Ancient Egyptian overseers of sealers
Officials of the Eleventh Dynasty of Egypt
Ancient Egyptian overseers of foreign lands